The 1974 CECAFA Cup was the second edition of the tournament. It was held in Tanzania, and is won by the hosts. The exact dates of the matches were not known.

Group A

Group B

Final

References
RSSSF info

CECAFA Cup
CECAFA
1974
1974 in Tanzanian sport